F-box/WD repeat-containing protein 10 is a protein that in humans is encoded by the FBXW10 gene.

Members of the F-box protein family, such as FBXW10, are characterized by an approximately 40-amino acid F-box motif. SCF complexes, formed by SKP1 (MIM 601434), cullin (see CUL1; MIM 603034), and F-box proteins, act as protein-ubiquitin ligases. F-box proteins interact with SKP1 through the F box, and they interact with ubiquitination targets through other protein interaction domains (Jin et al., 2004).[supplied by OMIM] Increased expression of the gene has been associated with laminopathies, and in degradation of chromatin associated proteins such as HP1, ATR kinases (Chaturvedi and ParnaiK, 2010, PMID: 20498703).

References

Further reading